Dzhurov or Djurov (Bulgarian: Джуров) is a Bulgarian masculine surname, its feminine counterpart is Dzhurova or Djurova. It may refer to
Chavdar Djurov (1946–1972), Bulgarian pilot 
Dobri Dzhurov (1916–2002), Bulgarian politician and military leader
Spas Dzhurov (born 1944), Bulgarian athlete

Bulgarian-language surnames